Shibu Baby John (born 27 July 1963) is an Indian politician, businessman, film producer and former Minister for Labour  of the State Government of Kerala, India. He is former  General Secretary of the state's Revolutionary Socialist Party (Baby John) party, which is based in Kerala. Now RSP (Baby John) merged with Revolutionary Socialist Party and he is now national committee member of RSP. In 21 February 2023, he was elected the Secretary of Revolutionary Socialist Party Kerala State Committee. He is the son of former RSP leader Baby John and Annamma John.

Personal life 
Shibu married Annie Constantine, a civil engineering graduate from TKM College of Engineering,  on 17January 1988 and the couple have two children. He graduated with a B.Tech. from TKM College of Engineering, Kollam. After his studies he ventured into the export business. In the 2001 Indian assembly elections he contested in Chavara constituency on the RSP ticket and won. Chavara constituency is known for having supported Baby John for decades. He left the RSP and launched the Revolutionary Socialist Party (Baby John) in 2005. In the 2006 assembly election he lost to N.K. Premachandran of the RSP.

In the 2011 assembly election he defeated then state minister N.K. Premachandran with a lead of 6061 votes in the Chavara constituency, and was sworn in as a minister on 23 May 2011.  But in 2014, both leaders merged their parties together, and this allowed Premachandran to join UDF and to pay way to Lok Sabha in the elections which soon followed. In 2016, he was defeated by Vijayan Pillai of Communist Marxist Party (CMP) Aravindakshan Fraction who is former panchayath member and district panchayath member of Chavara and son of veteran RSP leader N. Narayana Pillai.

References

External links 

 Official Website

State cabinet ministers of Kerala
1963 births
Living people
Kerala MLAs 2001–2006
Kerala MLAs 2011–2016
Malayali politicians
Kerala politicians